Chicle is a natural gum traditionally used in making chewing gum and other products. It is collected from several species of Mesoamerican trees in the genus Manilkara, including M. zapota, M. chicle, M. staminodella, and M. bidentata.

The tapping of the gum is similar to the tapping of latex from the rubber tree: zig-zag gashes are made in the tree trunk and the dripping gum is collected in small bags. It is then boiled until it reaches the correct thickness. Locals who collect chicle are called chicleros.

Etymology 

The word chicle comes from the Nahuatl word for the gum, which can be translated as "sticky stuff". Alternatively, it may have come from the Mayan word . Chicle was well known to the Aztecs and to the Maya, and early European settlers prized it for its subtle flavor and high sugar content. The word is used in the Americas and Spain to refer to chewing gum,  being a common term for it in Spanish and  being the Portuguese term (both in Brazil and in parts of Portugal; other areas also use the term ).

History 
Both the Aztecs and Maya traditionally chewed chicle. It was chewed as a way to stave off hunger, freshen breath, and keep teeth clean. Chicle was also used by the Maya as a filling for tooth cavities.

The American company American Chicle Company, incorporated in June 1899, was the first prominent commercial user of this ingredient in the production of chewing gum. Its brand name, Chiclets, is derived from the word chicle.

In response to a land reform law passed in Guatemala in 1952 which ended feudal work relations and expropriated unused lands and sold them to the indigenous and peasants, the William Wrigley Company discontinued buying Guatemalan chicle. Since it was the sole buyer of Guatemalan chicle, the government was forced to create a massive aid program for growers.

By the 1960s, most chewing gum companies had switched from using chicle to butadiene-based synthetic rubber, which was cheaper to manufacture. Only a handful of small gum companies still use chicle, including Glee Gum, Simply Gum, and Tree Hugger Gum.

References 

Manilkara
Natural gums
Crops originating from the Americas
Crops originating from Belize
Crops originating from Mexico
Crops originating from Colombia
Tree tapping
Non-timber forest products